Construction of the 11 megawatt Serpa solar power plant (also known as Hércules solar power plant) began in May 2006 and was completed as planned in January 2007, at the cost of 58 million euro. The plant uses SunPower subsidiary PowerLight's PowerTracker system to follow the sun's daily path across the sky and generate more electricity than conventional fixed-mounted systems. The plant provides enough electricity to supply approximately 8,000 homes.

The Serpa solar power plant was developed by the Portuguese company Catavento and it incorporates photovoltaic modules from SunPower, Sanyo, Sharp and Suntech.  General Electric Financial Services provided the financing for the project as part of its Ecomagination program.

Generating electricity from the sun with no fuel costs or emissions, the Serpa plant is on a 60-hectare (150-acre) hillside and is a model of clean power generation integrated with agriculture. The project supports a European Union initiative by saving more than 30,000 tons a year in greenhouse gas emissions compared to equivalent fossil fuel generation. The EU  agreed to cut greenhouse gas emissions by at least 20 percent by 2020, from 1990 levels.

Portugal relies heavily on imported fossil fuels, and its carbon dioxide emissions have increased 34 percent since 1990, which is among the fastest rates in the world. To address this, the country is implementing some of the world's most advanced incentives for installing renewable energy. The Serpa project relies on a preferential tariff mandated by the Portuguese government.

Solar power enjoys widespread support in Portugal, with the backing of 77 percent of the population, according to a European Commission study published in January 2007.

See also
Renewable energy in Portugal
Renewable energy in the European Union
Energy policy of the European Union
Renewable energy commercialization

References

External links
Portugal starts huge solar power plant
World's Largest Solar Photovoltaic Power Plant to be Built with GE Investment and PowerLight Technology
11-MW Solar PV Plant Dedicated in Portugal

Photovoltaic power stations in Portugal
Buildings and structures in Serpa
Buildings and structures in Beja District